Terravita is an American house and dubstep group from Boston, Massachusetts consisting of members Chris Barlow and Jon Spero. The group used to have a third member, Matt Simmers, who left the group in 2016 to pursue independent goals.

The group also has another electronic band named Hot Pink Delorean.

Discography

Extended plays

Singles
 2018: "Get Out of Here" (Dirty Bird)

References

External links

American electronic music groups
American musical duos
American house music duos
Dubstep music groups